Ludmilla is a northern inner suburb of the city of Darwin, Northern Territory, Australia. Ludmilla is a predominantly residential suburb and is usually associated with the adjacent inner Darwin suburbs of Parap, Fannie Bay and Stuart Park. The indigenous community of Bagot is located in Ludmilla.  

According to The Place Names Committee for the Northern Territory, the suburb's name came from Ludmilla Creek which was named by the government surveyor Gustav Sabine after Ludmilla Holtze, a German immigrant who arrived in Darwin with her parents and three brothers in 1872.

Gallery

References

External links

 https://web.archive.org/web/20110629040718/http://www.nt.gov.au/lands/lis/placenames/origins/greaterdarwin.shtml#l#l

Suburbs of Darwin, Northern Territory